Alexandru Djuvara (20 December 1858 – 1 February 1913) was a Romanian writer, journalist and politician.

Early years
Djuvara was born in Bucharest on 20 December 1858. He was the uncle of prominent Romanian historian Neagu Djuvara. 
After graduation from Lycée Louis-le-Grand in Paris, he went on to study Law in the School of History and Political Science. Having completed his law studies, Djuvara studied engineering at Paris Polytechnical School.

Political career
Djuvara served as the Minister of Foreign Affairs of Romania from 1 November 1909 until 28 December 1910 under the reign of Romanian King Carol I. He also served as the Minister of Industry and Commerce.

He died on 1 February 1913 in Bucharest.

See also
Foreign relations of Romania

References

External link

1858 births
1913 deaths
Politicians from Bucharest
Romanian people of Aromanian descent
Romanian Ministers of Industry and Commerce
Romanian Ministers of Justice
Romanian Ministers of Foreign Affairs